Charles Metcalf Allen (1871 in Walpole, Massachusetts – 1950 in Holden, Massachusetts) was a  hydraulic engineer known particularly for his inventions and development of the Allen Salt-Velocity Method for measuring water discharge in situations where other methods or instruments could not be easily used. In 1936, Allen received the ASME Warner Medal, and in 1949, he received the John Fritz Medal. From 1906 to 1945, Charles Metcalf Allen served as professor of hydraulic engineering at Worcester Polytechnic Institute. During that period he also performed research at the Alden Hydraulic Laboratory

References 

1871 births
1950 deaths
Hydraulic engineers
Worcester Polytechnic Institute alumni
Worcester Polytechnic Institute faculty